The Alraigo incident occurred on 6 June 1983, when a lost British Royal Navy Sea Harrier fighter aircraft landed on the deck of a Spanish container ship. Watson was launched in a pair of aircraft tasked with locating a French aircraft carrier under combat conditions including radio silence and radar switched off. After completing the search, Watson attempted to return to the Illustrious, but was unable to locate it. Running low on fuel, and with his radio having stopped working, Watson headed towards a nearby shipping lane, where he made visual contact with the container ship Alraigo.

He initially planned to eject in sight of the vessel, but noticed that its cargo provided a flat landing surface. The ship was carrying a base plate for a telescope being delivered to the Isaac Newton Telescope in the Canary Islands.

Four days later, the Alraigo arrived at Santa Cruz de Tenerife with the Sea Harrier still perched on its container. The event received widespread media coverage. The aircraft was salvageable, and the ship's crew and owners were awarded £570,000 compensation.

A subsequent Board of Inquiry found that Watson had completed only 75% of his training before he had been sent to sea. The board blamed Watson's inexperience, and criticised his commanders for the radio problems with his plane. Watson was reprimanded for displaying substandard airmanship and reassigned to a desk job. He eventually returned to flight duties and accrued nearly 3,000 hours of flying time before resigning his commission in 1996. Sea Harrier ZA176 was converted to the FA2 variant in 1992 and retired from service 20 September 2003. The aircraft is now on display at Newark Air Museum in Nottinghamshire, England in its FA2 configuration.

References

1983 in military history
1983 in Spain
20th-century history of the Royal Navy
Accidents and incidents involving the Harrier Jump Jet
Aviation accidents and incidents in 1983
Aviation accidents and incidents in the Atlantic Ocean
June 1983 events in Europe
Military history of the Atlantic Ocean
Tenerife